San Frediano ("Saint Fridianus") is the name of an early Christian Irish pilgrim, who became bishop of Lucca, Tuscany, Italy. Named after him are:

Basilica di San Frediano, Lucca
Church of San Frediano, Pisa
Church of San Frediano in Cestello, in Florence
Porta San Frediano, Florence, gate in the Southeastern sector of the former walls around the city of Florence
San Frediano a Settimo, a village in the province of Pisa